Reeds Spring is a city in Stone County, Missouri, United States. The population was 1,136 at the 2020 census. It is part of the Branson, Missouri Micropolitan Statistical Area.

History
The community has the name of Fitzhugh Reed, who settled at a spring near the original town site.

Geography
Reeds Spring is located at  (36.745692, -93.382727).

Demographics

2010 census
As of the census of 2010, there were 913 people, 374 households, and 259 families living in the city. The racial makeup of the city was 95.3% White, 0.1% African American, 1.6% Native American, 0.8% Asian, 0.3% from other races, and 1.9% from two or more races. Hispanic or Latino of any race were 2.3% of the population.

There were 374 households, of which 31.6% had children under the age of 18 living with them, 52.1% were married couples living together, 13.4% had a female householder with no husband present, 3.7% had a male householder with no wife present, and 30.7% were non-families. 24.1% of all households were made up of individuals, and 11.8% had someone living alone who was 65 years of age or older. The average household size was 2.44 and the average family size was 2.90.

The median age in the city was 35.5 years. 26.1% of residents were under the age of 18; 8.3% were between the ages of 18 and 24; 26.3% were from 25 to 44; 24.5% were from 45 to 64; and 14.8% were 65 years of age or older. The gender makeup of the city was 47.1% male and 52.9% female. 61.3% of women 12 and older had 1 or more children.

2000 census
As of the census of 2000, there were 465 people, 197 households, and 123 families living in the city. The population density was 735.9 people per square mile (285.0/km). There were 237 housing units at an average density of 375.1 per square mile (145.2/km). The racial makeup of the city was 96.34% White, 1.08% Native American, 0.22% Asian, 0.86% from other races, and 1.51% from two or more races. Hispanic or Latino of any race were 1.51% of the population.

There were 197 households, out of which 28.9% had children under the age of 18 living with them, 50.8% were married couples living together, 8.1% had a female householder with no husband present, and 37.1% were non-families. 31.0% of all households were made up of individuals, and 16.2% had someone living alone who was 65 years of age or older. The average household size was 2.36 and the average family size was 2.93.

In the city the population was spread out, with 26.2% under the age of 18, 7.3% from 18 to 24, 29.5% from 25 to 44, 22.4% from 45 to 64, and 14.6% who were 65 years of age or older. The median age was 36 years. For every 100 females, there were 92.1 males. For every 100 females age 18 and over, there were 88.5 males.

The median income for a household in the city was $25,982, and the median income for a family was $29,896. Males had a median income of $25,000 versus $18,125 for females. The per capita income for the city was $13,103. About 9.9% of families and 18.4% of the population were below the poverty line, including 21.6% of those under age 18 and 13.5% of those age 65 or over.

References

Cities in Stone County, Missouri
Branson, Missouri micropolitan area
Cities in Missouri